The 2003 Batang Red Bull Thunder season was the fourth season of the franchise in the Philippine Basketball Association (PBA). The team was known as Red Bull Barako Coffee Drink starting the Invitational Conference.

Draft picks

Occurrences
Red Bull Barako were tied with FedEx at 3–1 in the Group A standings of the Invitational Conference and gain the last berth in the crossover semifinals by way of a controversial ending in their game against Talk 'N Text, which the Phone Pals won 88–87, but needed to win by 8 points. The TNT players went to the extent of shooting on the Red Bull's goal while enjoying the lead in the closing seconds.

In the Reinforced Conference best-of-three quarterfinals series against Talk 'N Text, Red Bull lost in the deciding third game where guard Jimwell Torion put in a vicious clothesline on Phone Pal Jimmy Alapag with the outcome of the game beyond doubt, Torion's actions serve him an eight-month suspension.

Roster

Game results

All-Filipino Cup

References

Barako Bull Energy Boosters seasons
Batang